= Masseyville, West Virginia =

Masseyville
- Unincorporated community
- Location within the state of West Virginia Masseyville (the United States)
- Coordinates: 37°50′17″N 81°27′5″W
- Country: United States
- State: West Virginia
- County: Raleigh
- Elevation: 1,424 ft (434 m)
- Time zone: UTC-5 (Eastern (EST))
  - Summer (DST): UTC-4 (EDT)
- GNIS ID: 1555065

Masseyville is an unincorporated community in Raleigh County, West Virginia, United States.
